My Dear Heart is a 2017 Philippine drama television series starring Heart Ramos, Coney Reyes, Zanjoe Marudo, Bela Padilla and Ria Atayde. The series aired on ABS-CBN's Primetime Bida evening block and worldwide via TFC from January 23, 2017, to June 16, 2017, replacing Till I Met You in A Love to Last timeslot and was replaced by La Luna Sangre. 

The series is streaming online on YouTube.

Synopsis

The story revolves around Heart de Jesus (Nayomi Ramos), who grew up not knowing her biological parents because of her biological grandmother, and under the care of Jude (Zanjoe Marudo) and Clara de Jesus (Bela Padilla). She lives happily despite being poor and having a rare heart condition. Heart will then be put into a coma, which causes her soul to become visible to her doctor, Margaret Divinagracia (Coney Reyes). They then learn to love each other. Along the way, Heart will eventually know that Margaret is her grandmother, and Margaret’s daughter Gia (Ria Atayde) is her birth mother. Jude will then discover that the little girl he is taking care of is the fruit of his affair with Gia.

Cast and characters

Main cast
 Heart Ramos as Margaret Grace "Heart" L. de Jesus 
 Coney Reyes as Dr. Margaret Divinagracia-Lana
 Zanjoe Marudo as Jude de Jesus
 Bela Padilla as Clara M. Estanislao-de Jesus
 Ria Atayde as Dr. Gia D. Lana

Supporting cast
 Robert Arevalo as Dr. Albertus Camillus
 Eric Quizon as Dr. Francis Camillus
 Joey Marquez as Kapitan Christopher "Tope" Estanislao
 Rio Locsin as Lucia "Lucing" Magdangal-Estanislao
 Susan Africa as Catherine "Cathy" Filomena
 Loisa Andalio as Agatha M. Estanislao
 Izzy Canillo as Goyong
 Johnny Revilla as Robert Cortesano
 Enzo Pelojero as Bino
 Jameson Blake as Dr. Dominic Divinagracia
 Alicia Alonzo as Yaya Maria
 Mark Oblea as Vince
 Sandino Martin as Fr. Gabrielle "Gab" Magdangal
 Vic Robin III as Makoy
 Hyubs Azarcon as Bart Bernabe
 Jerry O'Hara as Lolo Rambo
 Rubi Rubi as Piling

Guest cast
 Kathleen Hermosa as Teresa
 Sue Ramirez as young Margaret
 Edu Manzano as Dr. Luke Divinagracia
 Jim Paredes as Martin Policarpio
 David Chua as Onse
 Niña Dolino as Nina Victorio
 Jao Mapa as Joseph De Jesus
 Guji Lorenzana as young Albertus
 Miko Raval
 John Manalo as young Jude
 Cessa Moncera as young Agatha
 Nhizky Calma as Victor
 Freddie Webb as Dr. Lana
 Tess Antonio as Mitring
 Vangie Labalan as Conching
 Rosario "Tart" Carlos as Nurse Alvarez
 Manuel Chua as Ghost-hunter
 JB Agustin as Anton
 Neil Coleta as Kevin Del Mundo

Reception

See also
 List of programs broadcast by ABS-CBN
 List of telenovelas of ABS-CBN

References

External links
 

ABS-CBN drama series
Fantaserye and telefantasya
2017 Philippine television series debuts
2017 Philippine television series endings
Television series by Dreamscape Entertainment Television
Television shows set in the Philippines
Filipino-language television shows
2010s children's television series